Dual-ported RAM (DPRAM) is a type of random-access memory that allows multiple reads or writes to occur at the same time, or nearly the same time, unlike single-ported RAM which allows only one access at a time. 

Video RAM or VRAM is a common form of dual-ported dynamic RAM mostly used for video memory, allowing the CPU to draw the image at the same time the video hardware is reading it out to the screen.

Apart from VRAM, most other types of dual-ported RAM are based on static RAM technology.

Most CPUs implement the processor registers as a small dual-ported or multi-ported RAM (see Register File).

Computer memory